My Star may refer to:

"My Star" (Brainstorm song)
"My Star" (Ian Brown song)
My Stars, a 1926 comedy film